Thermonotus nigripes is a species of beetle in the family Cerambycidae. It was described by Charles Joseph Gahan in 1888. It is known from Indonesia, Laos, India, China, and Malaysia.

References

Lamiini
Beetles described in 1888